Rahul Yadav Chittaboina (born 3 May 1998) is an Indian badminton player. He reached the semi-finals of 2017 Russian Open.

Achievements

BWF International Challenge/Series 
Men's singles

  BWF International Challenge tournament
  BWF International Series tournament
  BWF Future Series tournament

References

External links 
 

1998 births
Living people
Indian male badminton players